The condyloid process or condylar process is the process on the human and other mammalian species' mandibles that ends in a condyle, the mandibular condyle. It is thicker than the coronoid process of the mandible and consists of two portions: the condyle and the constricted portion which supports it, the neck.

Condyle 
The most superior part of the mandible, the condyle presents an articular surface for articulation with the articular disk of the temporomandibular joint; it is convex from before backward and from side to side, and extends farther on the posterior than on the anterior surface.

Its long axis is directed medialward and slightly backward, and if prolonged to the middle line will meet that of the opposite condyle near the anterior margin of the foramen magnum.

At the lateral extremity of the condyle is a small tubercle for the attachment of the temporomandibular ligament.

The articular surface of the condyle is covered by fibrous tissue, and interfaces with an articular disk (or meniscus) of avascular, non-innervated fibrous tissue (collagen, fibroblasts).  When the mouth is closed the meniscus is bordered medially and superiorly by the glenoid fossa of the petrous portion of the temporal bone.  When the mouth is opened maximally, the meniscus is distracted anteriorly and inferiorly along the slope of the inferior portion of the temporal bone towards the tubercle, or articular eminence, in order to remain interposed between the condyle and the temporal bone in all jaw positions.

Neck
The neck of the process rises from the posterior of the ramus mandibulae. It is flattened from before backward, and strengthened by ridges which descend from the forepart and sides of the condyle.

Its posterior surface is convex; its anterior surface has a depression for the attachment of the lateral pterygoid muscle.

Fractures
Because the articular disk prevents the mandible from moving posteriorly, the condylar neck is often subject to fracturing when the jaw suffers a blow.

Additional images

References

External links

 
  - "Osteology of the Skull: Mandible of Intact Skull"
 
 

Bones of the head and neck